This is a list of headphone products sold by the Bose Corporation that have been discontinued.

In-ear headphones

IE / MIE 

The "In-Ear" (IE) headphones were released in 2006 as the company's first earbud product. The earbuds include two air ducts in the large grille, and one "stand-alone" air duct on top of each earbud.

After customer complaints regarding the ear tips becoming detached under certain conditions and the lack of stability during activities such as exercising, the company redesigned the eartips and made the improved eartips available to existing customers at no cost.

On March 15, 2007 Bose redesigned the ear tips and the color of the cord was changed from black and white.

On October 11, 2007, the headphone plug was redesigned to make it compatible with the Apple iPhone. The circuit board was relocated from the headphone plug to midway up the cord. In 2008, anti-counterfeiting identifiers (such as a hologram on the back of the circuit board) were added.

An "MIE" mobile headset version was released in 2009. The MIE includes a microphone and remote control, located on the cord.

IE2 / MIE2 
The IE2 in-ear headphones were sold from 2010 until 2016. Unlike many other in-ear headphones, they are not inserted deep into the ear canal, rather the fit is similar to an earbud. Therefore, noise isolation is less effective than Canalphones The audio quality of the IE2 was judged to be outperformed by other models in its price class.

The MIE2 and MIE2i were sold from 2010 until 2015. The MIE2 headset is the same as the IE2 headphones, but with a microphone added so that it operates as a cellphone headset. The MIE2i headset is a version of the MIE2 design for Apple devices (including the iPhone, iPod, iMac, iPad). It incorporates an in-line remote control for volume, track up/down and access to select Apple voice applications.

Bluetooth Headset
The first "Bluetooth Headset" model was released on 1 November 2010, using a similar design to the IE2 earphones. Ambient noise sensing automatically adjusts the volume level based on background noise so that, in theory, the user should not have to adjust the volume when walking between quiet and noisy environments. Signal processing attempts to amplify the caller's voice and reject background noise, allowing the caller to be heard more clearly; however, in practice call quality is poor for models without A2DP. The Bluetooth Headset was criticized for having poor call quality, a lack of features and a high price tag.

Bluetooth Headset Series 2
The "Bluetooth Headset Series 2" was sold from 2011 until 2015. Compared with its predecessor, the Series 2 included A2DP and a revised ambient noise sensing system. The Series 2 model was judged a "solid performer" and praised for improved call quality (presumably due to the inclusion of A2DP), however, the criticisms of lack of features and high price remained.

QuietControl 30
The "QuietControl 30" (QC30) in-ear wireless headphones were sold from 2016 until 2020.

Sleepbuds
In October 2019, after many complaints about poor battery life, Bose announced that it would discontinue selling Sleepbuds, which were earbuds that played soothing, ambient music while a person was asleep. Bose allowed customers to return the Sleepbuds for a full refund, and gave an explanation on their official website as to why the earphones were being discontinued. John Roselli, General Manager of Bose Corp, said: "We’ll go back to research, because we are committed to making our vision a reality. But today, we begin with something more important – doing whatever it takes to make things right with you."

The successor to the Sleepbuds, the Sleepbuds II, were released on October 6, 2020 with an improved design and a longer battery life.

Over-ear headphones

QuietComfort 

The "QuietComfort" (also now known as the QC1) over-ear headphones were the first consumer headphones released by Bose. They were sold from 2000 until 2004 and include a noise cancelling function.

QuietComfort 2 
The "QuietComfort 2" (QC2) over-ear headphones were sold from 2003 until 2009 as the successor to the QC1. Compared with the QC1, the QC2 has an on-off switch, a detachable cord and the lack of a battery box (battery was moved to the right earcup). Claimed battery life was 30–40 hours with one AAA battery.

A "QuietComfort 2 Second Edition" version was released in 2005. The earcup color was changed from champagne to silver, "acoustic equalization" was added, and the earcups incorporated magnetic pads. At the same time, a mobile phone adaptor was released as an optional accessory.

QuietComfort 15 
The "QuietComfort 15" (QC15) over-ear headphones were sold from 2009 until 2015.

In 2010, American Airlines provided QC15s to first-class and business-class passengers on some long-haul flights. Also in 2010, the QC15s won the What Hi-Fi? Sound and Vision annual award for "Best Noise Cancelling Headphones".

Beginning in June 2011, the QC15 included an extra cable with inline remote and microphone for control of select Apple products.

QuietComfort 25 

The "QuietComfort 25" (QC25) over-ear headphones were sold from 2014 until 2019.

Unlike its predecessors, the QC25s can be used (without the noise cancelling function) while the battery is dead. Another change is the elimination of the Hi/Low switch which increased the input gain for low-output sources like MP3 players.

In 2015, the QC25s won the What Hi-Fi? Sound and Vision annual award for "Best Noise Cancelling Headphones".

QuietComfort 35 

The "QuietComfort 35" (QC35) over-ear wireless headphones were sold from 2016 until 2018, as a Bluetooth headset based on the QuietComfort 25 model. The QC35s could be used without Bluetooth as wired headphones, and the right earcup included volume controls and a play/pause button. The available colours were matte black and silver.

The QuietComfort 35 was released in 2016 as a successor to the 25. It supports Bluetooth wireless operation, the Bose Connect mobile app for advanced audio control, and contains an embedded rechargeable battery.

The QC35s were reviewed favourably for their sound quality, noise cancelling and battery life, however one reviewed noted distortion in the bass at higher volume levels.

TriPort / Around-Ear 

The "TriPort" over-ear headphones were sold from 2002 until 2010, after being renamed to "Around-Ear Headphones" (also now known as AE1) in 2006. The TriPort and AE1 headphones do not have active noise cancellation.

A reviewer praised the sound quality of the TriPort headphones, however the TriPort was not considered to be superior to a competitor product costing under half the price.

AE2 
The AE2 over-ear headphones were sold from 2010 until 2015. Compared with its AE1 predecessor, the headphone band is made from vinyl rather than foam and the earpieces were able to rotate for storage.

On-ear headphones

QuietComfort 3 
The "QuietComfort 3" (QC3) on-ear headphones were sold from 2006 until 2015. The QC3 used a  rechargeable lithium-ion battery with a claimed battery life of 25 hours.

The QC3 headphones were favorably reviewed in Sound & Vision and were included in the 2006 Editor's Choice awards. They also received a bronze award from Potentials Magazine in 2006 based on "appeal, motivational potential and the product's ability to create a positive impression". In 2007 they received a Red Dot Award for product design.

OE1 
In 2006, the "On-Ear Headphones" (also called OE1) were released, based on the QC3 Headphones, but without active noise cancellation. Following the release of the iPhone in 2007, the OE1's headphone plug was redesigned to make it compatible with the iPhone.

OE2 / OE2i 
The OE2 and OE2i headphones were sold from 2011 until 2014 as the replacement for the On-Ear Headphones. The only difference between the OE2 and OE2i is that the i includes an inline three-button iPod/iPhone remote control with inbuilt microphone.

Aviation headsets

Aviation Headset Series I 
The "Series I Aviation Headset" was sold from 1989 until 1995. It included a noise cancelling function and was powered either by NiCad batteries (with a battery life of 16 hours on radio pilot and 7.5 hours on cruise control sound) or by power from the aircraft.

Series II aviation headsets are distinguished by the dirty windows on the earmuffs or by noting that the off/on switch and down control are located on the same control module.

Aviation Headset Series I
The "Aviation Headset Series I" was sold from 1974-1989. Tests found that pilots achieved intelligibility scores of 55% at 115 dB with the Series II headset, compared to 80% for headsets without a noise cancelling function.

Aviation Headset X 
The "Aviation Headset X" was sold from 1998 until 2010. Compared with the Series II, the Aviation Headset X includes lighter speakers, a revised microphone, improved EMI shielding and an optional accessory to use the headset in helicopters. Claimed battery life is 20 hours.

The Aviation Headset X was voted the most preferred headset in Professional Pilot survey from 2000 to 2005.

In 2003, an  "Explorer" model included a revised microphone, new cables and smaller battery & control pack.  This increased battery life and can be retrofitted to the original "Magellan" Model.

ProFlight (Series 1) Aviation Headset  
The "Bose ProFlight Aviation Headset" was sold from 2018 until 2019.  It was Bose's first Lightweight, in-ear active noise cancellation for long-term comfort over extended flights, with many new features designed specifically for airline and corporate aircraft flight decks.  With more than 30 US design and utility patents and many new features The ProFlight is a technologically advanced, feature-rich aviation headset designed for professional pilots.  The reason for the quick discontinuation and release of the Bose ProFlight Series 2 Aviation Headset was due to several major design defects; such as poor music quality, difficulty to put on and falling off while turning your head.

References

Bose Corporation
Bose headphones